{{Infobox ski tour report
| name               = Tour de Ski
| image              = 
| image_caption      = 
| image_alt          =
| image_size         = 
| series             = 2021–22 FIS Cross-Country World Cup
| race_no            = 
| season_no          = 
| venue              = Lenzerheide, SwitzerlandOberstdorf, GermanyVal di Fiemme, Italy
| date               =  – 
| stages             = 6
| menfirst           = Johannes Høsflot Klæbo
| menfirst_nat       = NOR
| menfirst_natvar    = 
| menfirst_color     = yellow
| mensecond          = Alexander Bolshunov
| mensecond_nat      = RUS
| mensecond_natvar   =
| menthird           = Iivo Niskanen
| menthird_nat       = FIN
| menthird_natvar    = 
| menpoints          = Johannes Høsflot Klæbo
| menpoints_nat      = NOR
| menpoints_natvar   = 
| menpoints_color    = red
| womenfirst         = Natalya Nepryayeva
| womenfirst_nat     = RUS
| womenfirst_natvar  = '| womenfirst_color   = yellow
| womensecond        = Ebba Andersson
| womensecond_nat    = SWE
| womensecond_natvar =
| womenthird         = Heidi Weng
| womenthird_nat     = NOR
| womenthird_natvar  = 
| womenpoints        = Johanna Hagström
| womenpoints_nat    = SWE
| womenpoints_natvar = 
| womenpoints_color  = red
| previous           = 2021
| next               = 2022–23
}}
The 2021–22 Tour de Ski was the 16th edition of the Tour de Ski and part of the 2021–22 FIS Cross-Country World Cup. The World Cup stage event began in Lenzerheide, Switzerland on 28 December 2021 and concluded with the Final Climb stage in Val di Fiemme, Italy, on 4 January 2022. The tour was the fourth edition starting in Lenzerheide. Alexander Bolshunov from Russia and Jessie Diggins from United States were the title defenders.

Bolshunov wasn't able to win, as Johannes Høsflot Klæbo from Norway took the yellow bib on first stage and extended the lead over Russian to over two minutes. This is second overall victory for Klæbo. Natalya Nepryayeva won the women competition after her two overall second places in the past and became the first Russian female to win Tour de Ski.
Schedule

 Overall leadership 
Two main individual classifications are contested in the 2021–22 Tour de Ski, as well as a team competition. The most important is the overall standings, calculated by adding each skier's finishing times on each stage. Time bonuses (time subtracted) are awarded at both sprint stages and at intermediate points during mass start stage 5. In the sprint stages, the winners are awarded 60 bonus seconds, while on mass start stage 5, the first ten skiers past the intermediate point receive from 15 seconds to 1 seconds. The skier with the lowest cumulative time is the overall winner of the Tour de Ski. For the third time in Tour history, the skier leading the overall standings wears a yellow bib.

The second competition is the points standings, which replaced the sprint competition from past editions. The skiers who receive the highest number of points during the Tour win the points standings. The points available for each stage finish are determined by the stage's type. The leader is identified by a red bib.

The final competition is a team competition. This is calculated using the finishing times of the best two skiers of both genders per team on each stage; the leading team is the team with the lowest cumulative time.

Final standings

Overall standings

Points standings

Team standings

Stages
Stage 128 December 2021, Lenzerheide, Switzerland Bonus seconds to the 30 skiers that qualifies for the quarter-finals, distributed as following:
 Final: 60–54–48–46–44–42
 Semi-final: 32–30–28–26–24–22
 Quarter-final: 10–10–10–8–8–8–8–8–6–6–6–6–6–4–4–4–4–4

Stage 229 December 2021, Lenzerheide, SwitzerlandNo bonus seconds are awarded on this stage.

Stage 331 December 2021, Oberstdorf, GermanyNo bonus seconds are awarded on this stage.

Stage 41 January 2022, Oberstdorf, Germany Bonus seconds to the 30 skiers that qualifies for the quarter-finals, distributed as following:
 Final: 60–54–48–46–44–42
 Semi-final: 32–30–28–26–24–22
 Quarter-final: 10–10–10–8–8–8–8–8–6–6–6–6–6–4–4–4–4–4

Stage 53 January 2022, Val di Fiemme, ItalyStage 5 bonus seconds
 Men: 1 intermediate sprint, bonus seconds to the 10 first skiers (15–12–10–8–6–5–4–3–2–1) past the intermediate point.
 Women: 1 intermediate sprint, bonus seconds to the 10 first skiers (15–12–10–8–6–5–4–3–2–1) past the intermediate point.
 No bonus seconds are awarded at the finish

Stage 64 January 2022, Val di Fiemme, Italy'''

The race for "Fastest of the Day" counts for 2021–22 FIS Cross-Country World Cup points. No bonus seconds are awarded on this stage.

World Cup points distribution 
The table shows the number of 2021–22 FIS Cross-Country World Cup points to win in the 2021–22 Tour de Ski for men and women.

References

Sources

 
 

2021–22 FIS Cross-Country World Cup
2021 22
2021 in Swiss sport
2021 in German sport
2021 in cross-country skiing
December 2021 sports events in Germany
December 2021 sports events in Switzerland
2022 in Italian sport
2022 in German sport
2022 in cross-country skiing
January 2022 sports events in Germany
January 2022 sports events in Italy